Bonikka is a 2015 Sri Lankan Sinhala drama romance film directed by Louie Vanderstraeten and produced by Janaka Liyanage for Sannama Trading. It stars Malinda Perera and Sanju Samarasinghe in lead roles along with Gayesha Perera and Wilson Karunaratne. Music composed by Sarath Wickrama. It is the 1219th Sri Lankan film in the Sinhala cinema.

Plot

Cast
 Malinda Perera
 Sanju Samarasinghe
 Wilson Karunaratne
 Gayesha Perera as Mareena
 Shalika Edirisinghe
 Anoja Weerasinghe
 Rashmi Pushpika Sumanasekara
 Sarath Dikkumbura
 Kapila Sigera
 Sisira Kumaratunga

References

External links
ලුවී වැන්ඩස්ට්‍රාටන් ‘බෝනික්කා’ නැවත තනයි

2015 films
2010s Sinhala-language films
2015 romantic drama films
Sri Lankan romantic drama films